Àngel Planells i Cruañas (Cadaqués, December 2, 1901 - Barcelona, July 23, 1989) was a Spanish Catalan surrealist painter.

Born in Cadaqués, where he met artists like Eliseu Meifrèn, Joan Roig i Soler and Salvador Dalí. In 1918 he went to Barcelona to study painting, lithography and engraving, but he returned home due to economic problems. In 1928 he published his first surrealist poems and some art criticism articles.

Between 1928 and 1929, Planells participated in his first collective exhibitions in the Galeries Dalmau in Barcelona (1929) and in Girona. In Cadaqués he met René Magritte and other surrealist artists. Planells's first individual exhibition took place in 1930, in the Dalmau Galleries.

In 1936, Planells formed a part of the Logicofobista group, together with artists Artur Carbonell i Carbonell, Leandre Cristòfol i Peralba, Àngel Ferrant, Esteve Francés, A. Gamboa-Rothwoss, A. G. Lamolla, Ramon Marinello, Joan Massanet, Maruja Mallo, Jaume Sans, Nàdia Sokalova, Remedios Varo and Joan Ismael, and art critic and theorist Magí Cassanyes. The first Logicofobista Exhibition took place in Barcelona, in 1936. Same year, three works of Planells were shown at the London International Surrealist Exhibition. Since 1929 Planells lived in Blanes, where he worked as a professor at the School of Arts.

After the Spanish Civil War, Planells painted landscapes and still lifes, and in 1974 he returned to surrealism.

References
 Planellsurrealista. Biography of Angel Planells in english: pp. 258-275

External links
  Angel Planells Foundation
 Work of Angel Planells in the Art Institute of Chicago
  Work of Planells in the Museo Nacional Centro de Arte Reina Sofía

Modern painters
Painters from Catalonia
20th-century Spanish painters
20th-century Spanish male artists
Spanish male painters
Spanish surrealist artists
1901 births
1989 deaths
People from Alt Empordà